IC 1613 (object 1613 in the Index Catalogues (IC), also known as Caldwell 51) is an irregular dwarf galaxy, visible in the constellation Cetus near the star 26 Ceti.  It was discovered in 1906 by Max Wolf, and is approaching Earth at 234 km/s.

IC 1613 is a member of the Local Group.  It has played an important role in the calibration of the Cepheid variable period-luminosity relation for estimating distances.  Other than the Magellanic Clouds, it is one of the few Local Group dwarf irregular galaxy where RR Lyrae-type variables have been observed; this factor, along with an unusually low abundance of interstellar dust both within IC 1613 and along the line of sight enable especially accurate distance estimates.

In 1999, Cole et al. used the Hubble Space Telescope to find that the dominant population of this galaxy has an age of ~7 Gyr.  Using its Hess diagram, they found that its evolutionary history may be similar to that of the Pegasus Dwarf Irregular Galaxy.  Both galaxies are classified as Ir V in the DDO system. Also in 1999, Antonello et al. found five cepheids of Population II in IC 1613, giving self-evident support for the existence of a very old stellar population component of IC 1613.  In 1999, King, Modjaz, & Li discovered the first nova ever detected in IC 1613.

IC 1613 contains a WO star known as DR1, which might be the only Wolf–Rayet star in the galaxy, although a candidate WC+O binary, SPIRITS14bqe, has been found. The galaxy also contains a Luminous Blue Variable candidate, and a rich population of OB-type stars and OB associations.

There are many faint galaxies close to IC 1613, catalogued as members of the group NOGG H 57.

References

External links

Dwarf irregular galaxies
Local Group
Cetus (constellation)
1613
00668
03844
051b
Astronomical objects discovered in 1906
Astronomical events in the near future